The World Congress on Intelligent Transport Systems (commonly known as the ITS World Congress) is an annual conference and trade show to promote ITS technologies. ERTICO (ITS Europe), ITS America, ITS AsiaPacific and ITS Japan are its sponsors. Each year the event takes place in a different region (Europe, Americas or Asia-Pacific).

Intelligent transportation systems (ITS) are advanced applications which, without embodying intelligence as such, aim to provide innovative services relating to different modes of transport and traffic management and enable various users to be better informed and make safer, more coordinated, and 'smarter' use of transport networks. They are considered a part of the Internet of things.

History
The first ITS World Congress was held in 1994 in Paris, followed by the 2nd in Yokohama in 1995, and the 3rd in Orlando in 1996.  The rotation of the venue location among the regions of the world continued:

 1997: 4th, Berlin 
 1998: 5th, Seoul
 1999: 6th, Toronto 
 2000: 7th, Torino
 2001: 8th, Sydney 
 2002: 9th, Chicago 
 2003: 10th, Madrid
 2004: 11th, Nagoya
 2005: 12th, San Francisco 
 2006: 13th, London 
 2007: 14th, Beijing 
 2008: 15th, New York City 
 2009: 16th, Stockholm 
 2010: 17th, Busan 
 2011: 18th, Orlando
 2012: 19th, Vienna 
 2013: 20th, Tokyo 
 2014: 21st, Detroit 
 2015: 22nd, Bordeaux
 2016: 23rd, Melbourne 
 2017: 24th, Montréal 
 2018: 25th, Copenhagen 
 2019: 26th, Singapore
 2020: Los Angeles virtual
 2021: 27th, Hamburg

ITS World Congress Post Congress Reports are archived by ITS Japan.

Future locations
 2022: 28th, Los Angeles 
 2023: 29th, Suzhou
 2024: 30th, Dubai

External links
 Official ERTICO website
 Official ITS America website
 Official ITS Asia-Pacific website
 Official ITS World Congress 2021 website

References

Trade fairs
Recurring events established in 1994
Computer-related trade shows
Road transport events